Estrus is the phase when the female of a species is sexually receptive.

Estrus may also refer to:
Estrus Records, an independent record label from Bellingham, Washington
Estrus EP, an EP by John Frusciante